Oommen is a Syrian Christian surname from Kerala corresponding to the given name Oommen. It may refer to:

 John Oommen, Indian-Canadian computer scientist
 Lucy Oommen, Indian gynecologist
 Philip Oommen, or Philipose Mar Chrysostom (1918–2021), senior Metropolitan Bishop of the Mar Thoma Church
 T. K. Oommen, Indian sociologist
 Thomas K. Oommen, bishop in the church of South India

Indian surnames